is a former Japanese football player.

Playing career
Maegawa was born in Mie Prefecture on 20 June 1984. After graduating from high school, he joined J1 League club Kyoto Purple Sanga in 2003. However he could not play at all in the match. Kyoto also finished at the bottom place in 2003 season and was relegated to J2 League. On 11 September 2004, he debuted as substitute midfielder at the 76th minutes against Shonan Bellmare. However he could only play this match and left Kyoto end of 2004 season. In 2005, he moved to Japan Football League club Ehime FC. He played many matches and Ehime won the champions in 2005 season. Although Ehime was promoted to J2 from 2006, he retired end of 2005 season.

Club statistics

References

External links

1984 births
Living people
Association football people from Mie Prefecture
Japanese footballers
J1 League players
J2 League players
Japan Football League players
Kyoto Sanga FC players
Ehime FC players
Association football midfielders